Hybridoneura is a genus of moths in the family Geometridae.

Species
Hybridoneura abnormis Warren, 1898
Hybridoneura picta (Warren, 1901)
Hybridoneura truncata Prout, 1958

References

External links

Natural History Museum Lepidoptera genus database

Eupitheciini